Daviesia devito is a species of flowering plant in the family Fabaceae, endemic to south-eastern continental Australia. It is a dense, prickly shrub with sharply-pointed phyllodes and yellow, red, greenish and maroon flowers. It was previously known as Daviesia benthamii subsp. humilis until that subspecies was split into two new species.

Description

Taxonomy and naming
Daviesia devito is in a genus commonly known as bitter-peas. In 1982, Michael Crisp described Daviesia benthamii subsp. humilis in the Journal of the Adelaide Botanic Gardens, but in 2017 Crisp and Lyn G. Cook, in an article published in Phytotaxa, divided that subspecies into two new species, Daviesia schwarzenegger and D. devito. The specific epithets (devito and schwarzenegger) are references to the main actors in the Universal Studios 1988 film Twins, D. devito being the less vigorous of the two.

Distribution and habitat
Daviesia devito usually grows in mallee, sometimes woodland or heathland and is found in scattered populations from the Eyre Peninsula in South Australia to western Victoria and to near Condobolin in New South Wales.

References

devito
Flora of South Australia
Flora of Victoria (Australia)
Flora of New South Wales
Plants described in 2017
Taxa named by Michael Crisp